Vernonia blodgettii, the Florida ironweed or Blodgett's ironweed, is a species of perennial plant from family Asteraceae that is native to Florida and the Bahamas.

References

blodgettii
Flora of Florida
Flora of the Bahamas